Robert Amsel (born August 16, 1946, in Albany, New York) is an LGBT activist mainly known for his work in the Mattachine Society, a gay civil rights organization prominent in New York City throughout the 1960s. When the society disbanded in 1987, he was one of its most active members.

Biography
While attending Syracuse University between 1964 and 1968 (from which he obtained a Bachelor of Fine Arts degree), he came out into gay life. During the summer of 1967, while staying with his sister in New York, he volunteered at the Mattachine Society. As a result, he met Dick Leitsch, then president of the group.

Madolin Cervantes, a heterosexual woman who devoted her life to equality and was an officer of the society, had a large, rent-controlled apartment on West End Avenue, where the couple lived for another year, upon Amsel's graduation from Syracuse University.

According to Amsel, "Our phones in Madolin's pension, as we called it, were tapped, presumably by the F.B.I., who regarded folks seeking gay equality as a subversive group. In those days, tapping was primitive and reel-to-reel tape recorders were used to record private conversations. Frequently, the tape would run out and one could actually hear the spinning of the tape reels. When you know you're being taped, you might as well have fun with it. For this reason, I would have outrageous conversations in which I provided blow-by-blow descriptions of wild sexual escapades with prominent political foes of the era. If possible, we never said anything over the phone lines that was true."

At the time of the Stonewall riots, Dick Leitsch had been upgraded to executive director of Mattachine, and Amsel was its president.  Amsel would later write a cover article for the September 15, 1987, edition of The Advocate. The article, "Back to Our Future? A Walk on the Wild Side of Stonewall", was written by Amsel to "set the record straight – or gaily forward."  (An edited version, titled "Recalling the Stonewall Uprising", appears in the college textbook, "America Firsthand, Volume 2, Eighth Edition," Bedford/St. Martin's, 2011.)During this period, Amsel volunteered as a "buddy" to AIDS victims.

Amsel also worked to establish a Mattachine Society branch in Syracuse, which ultimately died out but was supplanted by newer organizations.  He also was one of a group of four Mattachine workers who started the now-common practice of surveying political candidates for office on gay rights issues.

In 1978, the faltering relationship of Amsel and Leitsch ended when Amsel moved to London for several years.  Amsel returned to New York in the summer of 1981, and then moved to Harrisburg, Pennsylvania, where he purchased a house. He later moved to Steelton,. where he also received his master's degree in American Studies from Penn State Harrisburg.

Amsel authored and self-published two supernatural novels through iUniverse, Manhattan Pharaoh (2004) and Devil Goddess (2006).

See also
LGBT history
Lesbian American history
Mattachine Society

References

External links
Amsel, Robert. "Recalling the Stonewall Uprising", "America Firsthand, Volume 2, Eighth Edition, Bedford/St. Martin's, 2010 http://www.bedfordstmartins.com/Catalog/Product.aspx?isbn=9780312489076&tab=tableofcontents
Amsel, Robert. "Back to Our Future? A Walk on the Wild Side of Stonewall", The Advocate, 15 September 1987.
https://www.cs.cmu.edu/afs/cs/user/scotts/bulgarians/stonewall.txt

Living people
1946 births
American civil rights activists
LGBT people from New York (state)
American LGBT rights activists
People from Albany, New York
Activists from New York (state)
Syracuse University alumni